Bright Lights: Starring Carrie Fisher and Debbie Reynolds (on-screen title is simply Bright Lights) is a 2016 documentary about the relationship between entertainer Debbie Reynolds (in her final film appearance) and her daughter, actress and writer Carrie Fisher. It premiered at the 2016 Cannes Film Festival and on January 7, 2017, on HBO.

A few weeks before the film's premiere broadcast, both Fisher and Reynolds died. On December 23, Fisher went into cardiac arrest and succumbed four days later, while Reynolds had a severe stroke from which she died on the following day, December 28.

Production
Alexis Bloom and Fisher Stevens directed the film, while Brett Ratner and Sheila Nevins served as executive producers on the film under their RatPac Documentary Films and HBO Documentary Films banner. According to USA Today the film is "an intimate portrait of Hollywood royalty ... [it] loosely chronicles their lives through interviews, photos, footage and vintage home movies... It culminates in a moving scene, just as Reynolds is preparing to receive the 2015 Screen Actors Guild Life Achievement Award, which Fisher presented to her mother."

Release
The film had its world premiere at the 2016 Cannes Film Festival on May 14, 2016. It was also screened at the Telluride Film Festival on September 3, 2016, and at the Hot Springs Documentary Film Festival on October 14, 2016. It went on to screen at the New York Film Festival on October 10, 2016 and the AFI Fest on November 13, 2016.

The documentary was to premiere on HBO in March 2017, but after the actresses' deaths in late December 2016, the network announced that they were reconsidering the air date. The decision was subsequently made to air the premiere on HBO on January 7, 2017.

Reception
On Rotten Tomatoes the film has an approval rating of 100%, based on 57 reviews, with an average rating of 8.93/10. The website's critical consensus reads, "Bright Lights: Starring Carrie Fisher and Debbie Reynolds is a touching, bittersweet, and ultimately charming love story that serves as a poignantly effective tribute to the strangely complicated, uniquely resilient mother/daughter duo." On Metacritic, the film has a score of 85 out of 100, based on 25 reviews, indicating "universal acclaim".

David Rooney of The Hollywood Reporter gave the film a positive review, writing: "If the film is as disorderly in its structure as the messy family history it surveys, time spent with these wonderful subjects makes that seem sweetly appropriate." David Ehrlich of Indiewire gave the film a "B", writing: "On a similarly sweet note, Bright Lights outlines the mutual resentments between Fisher and Reynolds, but is also happy to let sleeping dogs lie. If anything, Stevens and Bloom are fascinated by how well-adjusted their relationship appears to be, mother and daughter living next door to each other without ever tipping into Grey Gardens territory. They’re still so close, despite everything between them." Fionnuala Halligan of Screen International also gave the film a positive review, writing: "This touching love story - with each other, the past, and the camera - has clear appeal, to 'Old Hollywood' fans, to Star Wars followers, to voyeurs in general."

References

External links

 
 

2016 documentary films
2016 films
Carrie Fisher
Dune Entertainment films
HBO documentary films
Films directed by Fisher Stevens
2010s English-language films
2010s American films
English-language documentary films